The 1965 Australia Cup was the fourth season of the Australia Cup, which was the main national association football knockout cup competition in Australia. Thirteen clubs from around Australia qualified to enter the competition.

Teams

Preliminary round 1

Preliminary round 2

Quarter-finals

Semi-finals

First leg

Second leg

Sydney Hakoah won 6–2 on aggregate.

APIA Leichhardt won 6–3 on aggregate.

Final

After each team had taken 15 penalties, the shootout was abandoned in favour of a replay, due to diminishing light.

Replay

References

NSL Cup
Aust
Australia Cup (1962–1968) seasons